"The View" is a single by American singer Lou Reed and American heavy metal band Metallica. It is the only single taken from the studio album Lulu, released on September 27, 2011.

Critical reception

"The View" was released for streaming online in late September 2011. Examining reaction to the track and a previously released 30-second preview of the same, The New Zealand Herald reported that there was much negative reaction by fans online, and that the song had about twice as many "dislikes" as "likes" on YouTube. Not all reaction to the song was negative; Rolling Stone gave "The View" a 4 out of 5 star rating while the same song was rated 4.5 out of 5 by Artist Direct and positively by One Thirty BPM.

Music video 
The song's music video was directed by Darren Aronofsky and released on December 3, 2011, with cinematography by Matthew Libatique and produced by Scott Franklin through Protozoa Pictures, his and Aronofsky's production company. Originally it was planned that Aronofsky should helm a performance video for the album's second single "Iced Honey" but "when everyone got together, it became obvious 'The View' was the way to go."

Track listing

Personnel 
 Lou Reed – lead vocals, acoustic guitar, Continnum
 James Hetfield – vocals, rhythm guitar
 Kirk Hammett – lead guitar
 Robert Trujillo – bass
 Lars Ulrich – drums

References 

2011 singles
Lou Reed songs
Metallica songs
Songs written by Lou Reed
Songs written by James Hetfield
Songs written by Lars Ulrich
Songs written by Kirk Hammett
Songs written by Robert Trujillo
Alternative metal songs
Doom metal songs
2011 songs
Warner Records singles
Internet memes